MRSC may refer to: 

 Maritime Rescue Sub-Centre, a rescue coordination centre dedicated to organizing search and rescue in a maritime environment
 Member of the Royal Society of Canada
 Member of the Royal Society of Chemistry
 Municipal Research and Services Center, a Seattle, Washington, organization